The God of Wealth is a 2020 Malaysian Chinese-language comedy film. In the film, three bad guys from the sea bring chaos to a small, peaceful fishing village, and the God of Wealth is sent down from heaven to save the village and restore peace.

The film was released on 25 January 2020 in Malaysia. It was one of four 2020 Malaysian Chinese New Year films, along with A Moment of Happiness, Fight Lah! Kopitiam, and Good Wealth 2020.

Synopsis
Long time ago, there is a peaceful fishing village called Batu Village. But one day, a big wave washed up the coast and brought three guys ashore, Lai, Haha and Mao Mao. They are saved by a kind elderly couple. Instead of repaying them with good deeds, these three wicked "Lai Ha Mao" do much harm to the village, even pretending to be fortune tellers. So, the Heaven has sent down the God of Wealth to go under cover as a human to save the village. Can he save the village and bring back peace?

Cast 
 Eddy Ko
 Jacky Kam
 Frost Yaw
 Freddie Wong
 Eliza Wong
 James Wong
 Benny Sii Tuong Kai
 Gan Jiaqi as the God of Wealth

Production 
Filming took place in Port Klang and Batu Pahat in Malaysia. Actor Gan Jiaqi was initially nervous to shoot his scenes, as he worried that he was not fit enough to look good in a scene where his character fell naked from the sky, and followed a strict diet regimen for the part.

References 

2020 films
Malaysian comedy films
2020s Mandarin-language films
2020 comedy films